Kiruna FF is a Swedish football club located in Kiruna. The men's team competes in Division 2 Norra Norrland, in the Swedish football league system. The women's team competes in the fifth level.

Background

Kiruna FF/BoIS was formed on 21 December 1970, when Kiruna AIF, IFK Kiruna, Kebne IK and Kiruna BK merged into one club.  Since 2009 the club has been called Kiruna FF.  The Men's team plays in Division 3 Norra Norrland and the Ladies team in Division 1. Kiruna FF is Sweden's northernmost football club.

The 1991 season was the most successful in the history of the club when Kiruna FF progressed from the Division 1 Norra (Spring competition) to compete in the Division 1 Kvalsvenskan (Autumn competition) which was the highest level of second tier Swedish football.  In contrast since 2009 the club have been playing in the fifth tier in Division 3 Norra Norrland following their relegation from Division 2 Norrland in 2008.

Thanks to their concerted efforts the club has trained a number of committed and well-trained youth leaders over the years.  A key objective is to foster long-term prospective first-team players in accordance with the club's Corporate Plan. Two players from KFF that now compete in the Allsvenskan and Damallsvenskan are Jonas Lantto (Gefle IF) and Selina Henriksson (Umeå IK).

The club won the Midnattsolscupen (Midnight Sun Cup) in 1985, 1996, 1997, 2002, 2005 and 2008.

The club is affiliated to Norrbottens Fotbollförbund.

Season to season

Attendances
In recent seasons Kiruna FF have had the following average attendances:

Current squad
As of 27 April 2010.

Achievements

League
 Division 1 Norra:
 Winners (1): 1991

Cups
Midnattsolscupen:
Winners (6): 1985, 1996, 1997, 2002, 2005, 2008

European participations

Footnotes

External links
 Kiruna FF – official site

Football clubs in Norrbotten County
Sport in Norrbotten County
Sport in Kiruna
Association football clubs established in 1970
1970 establishments in Sweden